Park Lawn Cemetery is a large cemetery in the Etobicoke district of Toronto, Ontario, Canada. It currently has around 22,000 graves. It is managed by the Park Lawn Limited Partnership, which also runs five other cemeteries in Toronto. The cemetery offers ground burials and a mausoleum for above-ground interment and cremation urns. It is located south of Bloor Street, west of the Humber River.

Park Lawn Cemetery & Mausoleum opened in 1892 as Humbervale Cemetery and was owned by local farmers in the area. It was sold in 1912 and again in 1915 to Park Lawn Cemetery Company, and was renamed to the current name. In 1999, Park Lawn opened Paradise Mausoleum; phase two of Paradise Mausoleum was completed in 2007.

Controversy arose in 1995 when the company re-zoned a section of the cemetery to permit construction of a condominium building. While the building was strongly opposed by some who had purchased lots, or had residents buried there, the Ontario Municipal Board approved the project. The cemetery has twice been attacked by vandals, once in 1990 and again in 2006. Both times several youths were convicted of damaging or toppling several hundred stones.

Notable interments
The cemetery contains 96 war graves of Commonwealth service personnel, 19 from World War I and 67 from World War II.

Athletes
 Harold Ballard – minor league hockey coach, manager, National Hockey League (NHL) owner Toronto Maple Leafs
 Glen Brydson – NHL player
 Lou Cavalaris Jr. – Canadian Horse Racing Hall of Fame trainer
 Busher Jackson – NHL player
 Butch Keeling – NHL player, minor league coach, NHL referee
 Andy Kyle – former Cincinnati Reds outfielder, minor league baseball player, hockey player with the National Hockey Association (NHA) Toronto Blueshirts, golf player
 Jack Marks – NHL and minor league hockey player 
 Lou Marsh – sprinter, Toronto Argonauts football player, Canadian military officer, NHL referee, Toronto Star sports editor
 Alex Romeril – minor league and NHA player, NHL referee, Toronto Maple Leafs head coach
 Conn Smythe – ice hockey player and coach, owner of the NHL Toronto Maple Leafs
 Doris and Freeman Coone – among the founding members of Kingsway Baptist Church / Mission Circle & Deacon

Politicians
 Fergy Brown – Metro Toronto Councillor, city councillor mayor of York, Ontario
 John MacBeth – Ontario PC MPP (York West and Humber) and provincial cabinet minister
 Rob Ford – Toronto City Councillor and Mayor of Toronto, Ontario
 Doug Ford Sr. – Toronto MPP and father of former Toronto Mayor/City Councillor Rob Ford and Premier of Ontario and former Toronto City Councillor Doug Ford

Musicians
 Jeff Healey – jazz and blues musician

Businesspersons
 George Harding Cuthbertson – yacht designer, founding partner of Cuthbertson & Cassian Designs and C&C Yachts, president of C&C Yachts for 8 years
 Sir Henry Pellatt – financier, soldier and builder of Casa Loma (Forest Lawn)

Others
 Gordon Sinclair – journalist with CBC and Toronto Star and for CFRB 1010 radio
 Stanley Frolick – lawyer, Ukrainian Canadian activist

Mass grave
The cemetery contains a mass grave containing the remains of 75 "Home Children" from Britain.

Other cemetery locations
Five other cemeteries affiliated with Park Lawn are located in or near Toronto:

 Forest Lawn – established in 1911 (crematorium in 1980) and located on the west side of Yonge Street, north of Highway 401 in North York
 Hillcrest – established in 1916 and located at Islington Avenue and Highway 7 in Woodbridge
 Riverside – established in 1892 and located at Royal York Road and Lawrence Avenue West in Etobicoke
 Sanctuary Park – established in 1927 and located at Royal York Road and The Westway (across from Riverside) in Etobicoke
 Westminster – established in 1926 and located at Bathurst Street north of Finch Avenue West in North York, next to the Jewish burial grounds Beth Tzedec Memorial Park and overlooking the G. Lord Ross Reservoir.

References

Cemeteries in Toronto
Etobicoke
1892 establishments in Ontario
Cemetery vandalism and desecration